Procopius was a Roman patrician and military leader.

Descended from the Roman usurper Procopius, Procopius was the father of Roman Emperor Anthemius, and married to the daughter of Flavius Anthemius.

In the Roman–Sasanian War of 421–422, Procopius commanded soldiers of the late Roman army (possibly as a dux or comes rei militaris) and secured the rescue of Roman units that were ambushed by Zhayedan forces.  In 422, he was an envoy in the conflict-ending negotiations.  For these successes, Procopius was awarded the title of patrician and made magister militum per Orientem (possibly by Theodosius II to succeed Ardabur), a post he held through at least 424.

References

5th-century Romans
magistri militum
patricii
people of the Roman–Sasanian Wars